The Eleven Bagatelles, Op. 119 were written by Ludwig van Beethoven between the 1790s and the early 1820s.

History

By the end of 1803, Beethoven had already sketched bagatelles Nos. 1 to 5 (along with several other short works for piano that he never published). In 1820, he composed the last five bagatelles of Op. 119, and published them as a set of five in 1821. The following year, he revised his old bagatelle sketches to construct a new collection for publication, adding a final bagatelle, No. 6, composed in late 1822. He then sent off this set of six to England for publication in 1823, along with Nos. 7 to 11, which had not yet been published in England.
The English publisher printed all eleven bagatelles together as one collection, and it is unclear to what degree this represents the composer's intentions. Some scholars have argued that the two halves of Op. 119 — Nos. 1 to 6, and Nos. 7 to 11 — are best thought of as separate collections. However, it is also possible that when Beethoven composed No. 6 in late 1822, he had already planned to send all eleven pieces to England. In that case, No. 6 would not be meant as a conclusion to the first five, but as a way to connect them with the latter five. The key relationship and thematic similarities between No. 6 and No. 7 support this hypothesis, as does the fact that in subsequent correspondence, Beethoven expressed only satisfaction with how the bagatelles were published in England.

Form

A typical performance of Op. 119 lasts around fourteen minutes.

G minor. Allegretto
C major. Andante con moto
D major. A l'Allemande
A major. Andante cantabile
C minor. Risoluto
G major. Andante — Allegretto
C major. Allegro, ma non troppo
C major. Moderato cantabile
A minor. Vivace moderato
A major. Allegramente
B major. Andante, ma non troppo
The first Bagatelle, a minuet, begins with a melancholy theme in G minor, which recurs frequently throughout the piece. A second theme in E-flat major is introduced, then a haunting passage segues into a repeat of the first theme, which is followed by a variation on said theme. The piece concludes with a restatement of the first theme in C minor, followed by a modulation back to G minor, then a Picardy third.

See also
Bagatelles, Op. 33
Bagatelles, Op. 126

External links 
 

Piano solos by Ludwig van Beethoven
1822 compositions